Football has been included at two editions of the Goodwill Games. It was first held as a men's competition in 1994, and later as a women's competition in 1998. The sport was dropped for the 2001 Goodwill Games.

Men's tournament

Participating nations

Results

Women's tournament

Participating nations

Results

Medal table

References

 
Sports at the Goodwill Games
Goodwill Games